Lionel Charlie Ramsbottom-Isherwood (13 April 1891 – 30 September 1970) was an English first-class cricketer. Isherwood was a right-handed batsman who bowled right-arm medium pace.

Lionel was the only son of Charles Edward Ramsbottom-Isherwood of Southsea in Hampshire and his wife, Isabel Catherine, the daughter of Joseph Bonsor. His uncle was Francis William Ramsbottom-Isherwood, the cricketer and rugby player.

Isherwood made his first-class debut for Hampshire in 1919 against Gloucestershire. Isherwood represented the club in 26 matches, with his final match for the club coming in the 1923 County Championship against Nottinghamshire. Isherwood made 627 runs for the club at an average of 16.50, including three half-centuries with a top score of 61*.

Isherwood represented the Marylebone Cricket Club in six matches between 1923 and 1927. His first match for the MCC came against Cambridge University at Lord's. His final appearance for the MCC came against Argentina, on the MCC's tour to South America.

Isherwood's next and last county after leaving Hampshire was Sussex, joining them in 1925. Making his debut against Leicestershire in the 1925 County Championship, Isherwood would represent the club in 28 first-class matches, the last of which came in 1927 against Kent. Isherwood scored 787 runs at an average of 16.75, making three half centuries, including his highest first-class score of 75*.

Isherwood died in Merrow, Surrey on 30 September 1970.

External links
Lionel Isherwood at Cricinfo
Lionel Isherwood at CricketArchive
Matches and detailed statistics for Lionel Isherwood

1891 births
1970 deaths
People from Southsea
English cricketers
Hampshire cricketers
Marylebone Cricket Club cricketers
Sussex cricketers
English cricketers of 1919 to 1945